B & O Bridge or B&O Bridge may refer to:

Baltimore & Ohio Railroad Bridge, Antietam Creek, crossing Antietam Creek near Keedysville, Maryland
B & O Railroad Potomac River Crossing, crossing the Potomac River between Sandy Hook, Maryland, and Harpers Ferry, West Virginia
B&O Railroad Bridge, crossing the Schuylkill River in Philadelphia, Pennsylvania
B & O Railroad Viaduct, crossing the Ohio River in Bellaire, Ohio
Glenwood B&O Railroad Bridge, crossing the Monongahela River in Pittsburgh, Pennsylvania
Thomas Viaduct, Baltimore & Ohio Railroad, crossing the Patapsco River between Relay and Elkridge, Maryland